Hisba (Arabic for "verification") may refer to one of the following concepts:
Hisbah control of observance of Islamic principles
Hisbah (business accountability)
Hisba (book), a 12th-century book of Ibn Taymiyyah